Roy Kalman Altman (born 1982) is a United States district judge of the United States District Court for the Southern District of Florida.

Biography 

Altman received a Bachelor of Arts in 2004 from Columbia University, where he was quarterback on the football team and was a pitcher on the baseball team. He earned his Juris Doctor in 2007 from Yale Law School, where he was Projects Editor for the Yale Law Journal. He began his legal career as a law clerk to Judge Stanley Marcus of the United States Court of Appeals for the Eleventh Circuit.

Altman served for six years as an Assistant United States Attorney for the Southern District of Florida, where he prosecuted hundreds of criminal cases and tried more than 20 cases to jury verdict, arguing several of them before the United States Court of Appeals for the Eleventh Circuit. He won the Director of the Executive Office of U.S. Attorneys Award for Superior Litigation Team in United States v. Mentor, the Director of the Executive Office of U.S. Attorneys Award for Superior Litigation Performance in United States v. Flanders, the Federal Bar Association Young Federal Lawyer Award, and the Federal Prosecutor of the Year award from the Miami-Dade County Association of Chiefs of Police and the Law Enforcement Officers Charitable Foundation.

Before becoming a judge, he was a partner at the law firm of Podhurst Orseck in Miami, Florida, where he specialized in aviation law and commercial litigation.

Federal judicial service 

Altman was mentioned as a potential judicial nominee in February 2018. On April 26, 2018, President Donald Trump announced his intent to nominate Altman to serve as a United States District Judge of the United States District Court for the Southern District of Florida. On May 7, 2018, his nomination was sent to the Senate. He was nominated to the seat vacated by Judge Joan A. Lenard, who assumed senior status on July 1, 2017. On June 20, 2018, a hearing on his nomination was held before the Senate Judiciary Committee. On July 19, 2018, his nomination was reported out of committee by a 17–4 vote.

On January 3, 2019, his nomination was returned to the President under Rule XXXI, Paragraph 6 of the United States Senate. On January 23, 2019, President Trump announced his intent to renominate Altman for a federal judgeship. His nomination was sent to the Senate later that day. On February 7, 2019, his nomination was reported out of committee by a 16–6 vote. On April 3, 2019, the Senate invoked cloture on his nomination by a 66–33 vote. On April 4, 2019, Altman was confirmed by a 66–33 vote. He received his judicial commission on April 9, 2019.

Memberships 

He was a member of the Federalist Society from 2004 to 2007 and rejoined the organization in 2015.

See also 
 List of Hispanic/Latino American jurists
 List of Jewish American jurists

References

External links 
 

1982 births
Living people
21st-century American lawyers
21st-century American judges
Assistant United States Attorneys
Columbia University alumni
Federalist Society members
Florida lawyers
Hispanic and Latino American judges
Judges of the United States District Court for the Southern District of Florida
People from Caracas
United States district court judges appointed by Donald Trump
Yale Law School alumni